João Pedro Furtado da Cunha Semedo (20 June 1951 – 17 July 2018) was a Portuguese physician and politician. 

He was born in 1951 in Lisbon, where he attended Camões Secondary School and graduated from the Faculty of Medicine of the University of Lisbon in 1975. Between 1972 and 1974, he was a member of the board of the Association of Students of that college. In 1975, he participated in the creation and dynamization of the Movement ALFA (for adult literacy), to whose direction it belonged. He completed his internship in the former Civil Hospitals of Lisbon, now the Hospital Central Lisbon Center, and then integrated the national movement of internal physicians.

He moved to Oporto in 1978, where he practiced medicine and developed his political, social and cultural activity. Participated in the founding of the Union of Doctors of the North and the Popular University of Porto, integrated the direction of FITEI and the artistic cooperative Tree. He worked in several public, private and social health services, did a postdoctoral degree in Drug Addiction at the Faculty of Psychology of Porto and worked in Associação Norte Vida with the homeless population. In the 1990s he was founder and director of a private clinic and directed the medical services of an IPSS. Between 2000 and 2006, he was chairman of the Board of Administration of the Joaquim Urbano Hospital, a unit of the National Health Service (SNS) specialized in respiratory and infectious diseases. In 2006, he leaves the administration of the hospital to be a Member of the Assembly of the Republic on an exclusive basis.

He joined the Union of Communist Students (UEC) and, consequently, the Portuguese Communist Party (PCP) in 1972. In 1973, he was detained by the political police of the Estado Novo dictatorial regime, PIDE/DGS, accused of subversive activities. He served on the Central Commission of the UEC and the Central Committee of the PCP. He resigned from the PCP Central Committee in 1991 and the party in 2000. In 2003 he participated in the creation of the Communist Renewal Movement. In 2004, as an independent member, he joins the list of the Left Bloc (BE) to the European Parliament and in 2005, he is a candidate for the same party to the Assembly of the Republic, which he would repeat in 2009 and 2011 as head of the list by the circle of Porto. He was a national deputy between 2006 and 2015, resigning halfway through the last term because of illness. It was the candidate of the BE to the municipal councils of Gondomar, in 2005, of Gaia, in 2009 and of Lisbon, in 2013, never being the most voted.

He died on 17 July 2018.

References

1951 births
2018 deaths
20th-century Portuguese physicians
University of Lisbon alumni
People from Lisbon
Portuguese Communist Party politicians
Left Bloc politicians
Members of the Assembly of the Republic (Portugal)